Tarco Aviation (formerly Tarco Air) is an airline based in Khartoum, Sudan, established in 2009. In December 2018 the company changed its name to Tarco Aviation, with ICAO code TQQ. With over 1,200 employees and 11 aircraft, the company is one of the largest aviation companies in Sudan currently operating scheduled passenger flights, charter and leasing.

Destinations
Tarco Aviation provides services around Sudan, North, East and Central Africa and also the Middle East.

Flights to Entebbe Uganda looked likely to resume on October 1, 2020, after a period of dormancy due to COVID-19.  This is according to the Uganda Civil Aviation Authority. As of June 2022, Tarco Air's fleet consists of eleven aircraft with an average age of 23.4 years.

Fleet
The Tarco Aviation fleet comprised the following aircraft (as of November 2022):

The airline fleet previously included the following aircraft (as of November 2015):
 2 Boeing 737-400
 1 Embraer ERJ 135

Accidents and incidents

 On 11 November 2010 an Antonov An-24 operating a passenger flight from Khartoum to Zalingei Airport, Sudan crashed on landing and burst into flames on the runway. The official report stated that two passengers died; however, there were reports ranging from 1 to 6 fatalities.

References 

Airlines banned in the European Union
Airlines established in 2009
Airlines of Sudan
Companies based in Khartoum